Northmen: A Viking Saga is a 2014 historical action film by Swiss director Claudio Fäh. It is an English-language film, produced by Swiss production house Elite Film Produktion AG (Zurich) in co-production with Jumping Horse Film GmbH (Germany, Hannover) and Two Oceans Production PTY Ltd. (South Africa, Cape Town).

The soundtrack of the movie contains 3 metal songs; 1 by the German symphonic metal/power metal band Beyond the Black ("In the Shadows") and 2 by the Swedish melodic death metal band Amon Amarth ("Deceiver of the Gods" and "Warriors of the North").

Summary
A group of exiled Vikings, under the leadership of Asbjörn, are stranded on the Scottish coast after their ship sank in a storm. There, they are attacked by soldiers who guard princess Inghean, who is on her way to her wedding. The Vikings defeat the soldiers and take Inghean with them as a hostage with the intent of using the ransom money to buy entry into friendly land. Along the way, they meet a Christian monk who grants them aid and shelter. Meanwhile, Inghean's father, King Dunchaid, tasks a mercenary force to pursue the Vikings; knowing of Inghean's distaste for their group, the mercenary leaders plan to kill both her and the Vikings, an order not out of character for the tyrant king. The group, including the princess, learn of their plan from a captured soldier.

As the mercenaries attack the tower where the monk and the Vikings are sheltered, the group manages to escape and stay ahead of their pursuers. The monk offers to show the Vikings the way to the Viking settlement Danelaw, where they would be safe. Along the way, they are repeatedly attacked by the mercenaries, but the Vikings eventually defeat them, suffering some casualties. After reaching a cliffside with transport to Danelaw, the survivors find themselves trapped by King Dunchaid and his troops. Asbjörn jumps into the water, seemingly to his death, but manages to retrieve a boat from an underwater cave. The surviving Vikings jump after him, joined by the monk and Inghean, who elects to stay with the group. Together, the group rows towards Danelaw.

Cast
 Tom Hopper as Asbjörn
 Ryan Kwanten as Conall
 Ken Duken as Thorald
 Charlie Murphy as Inghean
 Ed Skrein as Hjorr
 Anatole Taubman as Bovarr
 Leo Gregory as Jorund
 James Norton as Bjorn
 Darrell D'Silva as Gunnar
 Johan Hegg as Valli
 Danny Keogh as King Dunchaid

Production
The film is directed by Hollywood-based Swiss director Claudio Fäh from a script by Austrians Mattias Bauer and Bastian Zach, the writers of the Swiss horror film One Way Trip 3D.

Reception
On Metacritic, the film has a weighted average score of 50 out of 100, based on five critics, indicating "mixed or average reviews".

References

External links
 
 
 Teaser trailer (English)

Films directed by Claudio Fäh
2014 films
Films set in Scotland
Films set in the Viking Age
Historical action films
2010s historical action films
Swiss historical films
English-language Swiss films
2010s English-language films